James Pearce is a British journalist and presenter for BBC Sport, who has reported from eight Olympic Games. Pearce was the Olympic Correspondent for the BBC at the 2012 London Olympic Games. Notable scoops by Pearce include the revelation that England were attempting to 'butter' up FIFA voters with gifts of luxury handbags in order to gain votes during their ill-fated bid for the 2018 World Cup. Pearce holds the dubious honour of scoring the first "goal" at the new Wembley Stadium during a broadcast on the BBC News channel.

Early life
Pearce was brought up in the village of Pirbright in Surrey.

Education
Pearce was educated at Radley College, which he entered in 1983, a boarding independent school near the village of Radley in Oxfordshire, followed by the University of Exeter in Devon, where he studied Politics.

References

External links
Official website
Twitter

Alumni of the University of Exeter
British male journalists
British sports journalists
British broadcasters
People educated at Radley College
Living people
Year of birth missing (living people)
20th-century British journalists
21st-century British journalists
People from the Borough of Guildford